Cora casasolana is a species of basidiolichen in the family Hygrophoraceae. Found in Mexico, it was formally described as a new species in 2016 by Bibiana Moncada, Rosa Emilia Pérez, and Robert Lücking. The specific epithet casasolana refers to Mexican entomologist José Arturo Casasola González, who accompanied and assisted the authors in the expedition where the lichen was found. It is only known to occur in the type locality in Santiago Comaltepec, Oaxaca, where it grows on the ground between plants.

References

casasolana
Lichen species
Lichens described in 2016
Lichens of Mexico
Taxa named by Robert Lücking
Basidiolichens